Quercus confertifolia, synonym Quercus gentryi, is a species of flowering plant in the family Fagaceae, native to northern and southwestern Mexico.

Description

Taxonomy
Quercus confertifolia was first described by Aimé Bonpland in 1810. Quercus confertifolia Torr., published in 1859 (and so a later homonym), has been used to refer to Quercus hypoleucoides.

Under the synonym Quercus gentryi, Denk et al. in 2017 placed the species in Quercus section Lobatae.

References

confertifolia
Flora of Northeastern Mexico
Flora of Northwestern Mexico
Flora of Southwestern Mexico
Plants described in 1810